Peter Warlock (born Alec William Bell; 30 October 1904 – 17 December 1995) was a semi-professional magician and publisher of the British magic magazines "Pentagram" (1946–59) and the "New Pentagram" (1969–89).

Career 
In 1960, he became the honorary president of the Paisley Magic Circle. Peter Warlock was also asked to accept the Honorary Life Presidency of the Blackpool Magic Club after the death of the initial holder of that position, Edward Victor, which he did. He was followed in that distinction by Ken Dodd O.B.E.

Inventions 
 Self Contained Milk Pitcher
 Ringcord
 Out of the Loop
 Giant Size Triple Tubes
 Silk Filter
 Adhesive Glass
 Cream of the Jest
 Atomic Silk
 Ring and Rope Release

Published works 
 The Best Tricks With Slates (1942)
 Plans for Deception (1942)
 Patterns for Psychics (1947)
 Peter Warlock's Book of Magic (1956)
 Warlock's Way (1966)
 The Magic of Pavel (1981)
 P.T. Selbit: Magical Innovator (with Eric Lewis; 1989)
 Buatier de Kolta: Genius of Illusion (1993)

Family life 
He is the father of Elizabeth Warlock, who started performing as a stage magician at the age of 16 and who, in 2005, wrote the book One Hundred by Warlock about Peter Warlock's work.

See also
 List of magicians
 Card magic

References

External links
 See more about Peter Warlock at MagicPedia, the free online Magic encyclopedia
 Peter Warlock bibliography
 100 by Warlock

1904 births
1995 deaths
British magicians
Card magic
Academy of Magical Arts Literature & Media Fellowship winners
Academy of Magical Arts Masters Fellowship winners